Nymphaea lotus f. thermalis (sometimes referred to as Nymphaea lotus var. thermalis)  is a form of Nymphaea lotus (commonly called the tiger lotus, white lotus or Egyptian white water-lily) in the genus Nymphaea. Whilst some authorities list Nymphaea lotus f. thermalis as being synonymous with N. lotus, others list it as a distinct taxon – further investigation is required to determine its precise classification. The usual habitat for Nymphaea lotus is the Nile Delta, hence Nymphaea lotus f. thermalis'''s Romanian habitat is unusual.

 Description Nymphaea lotus f. thermalis is a water lily which blooms at night – its flowers last four days and have four sepals, 19–20 white petals along with yellow anthers and stamens. There is usually a 15–30 cm gap between flowers and the surface of the water, flowers are slightly fragrant; the round leaves of the plant are 20–50 cm wide. A description was first formally published in Math. Természettud. Értes. 25(4):32, 36. 1907.

 Habitat Nymphaea lotus f. thermalis is endemic to the thermal water of the Peţa River, Sânmartin, Bihor County, Romania. The area is protected as a nature reserve (51.0 hectares (126 acres) in size) and consists of a rivulet along with three ponds. The water has a roughly constant temperature of around 30 °C whilst the site has an average air temperature of 10–11 °C. The thermal waters have been recorded as early as 1211, but it was only in 1799 that the first record of N. lotus was made, by Pál Kitaibel. Janos Tuzson proposed in 1907 that this population's unusual location could be explained by the persistent heat provided by the thermal springs could have sustained the population at a pre-ice age time when the plant would have been spreading across the warmer regions of Europe; this theory was corroborated by additional evidence provided by the identification of other endemic species. Alexandru Borza was the Government minister in charge of education (and also a botanist) who made the first push for legal protection and recognition of  Nymphaea lotus f. thermalis – in 1932, the Cabinet of Romania declared the rivulet a nature reserve and the plant a "national monument". Conservation action with the intent to preserve this population has been undertaken for many years (since at least 1940) –  including the management of invasive species – and the plant has been included in recent water management legislation.

Whilst not held in any Romanian botanical gardens, Nymphaea lotus f. thermalis'' is grown at Royal Botanic Gardens Kew and at the botanic garden of Bonn University.

References 

lotus f. thermalis
Endemic flora of Romania
Forma taxa